JumpStart Games, Inc., formerly Knowledge Adventure, Inc., is an American edutainment video game company based in Torrance, California. Founded in 1991, it owns the Neopets virtual pet website, and is itself owned by Chinese holding company NetDragon Websoft.

History 

Until 1994, Knowledge Adventure had created DOS games, including Knowledge Adventure The Game, Isaac Asimov's Science Adventure, Space Adventure, Mario Teaches Typing, Mario Is Missing!, San Diego Zoo Presents: The Animals!, Dinosaur Adventure, The Tale of Peter Rabbit, Mario's Time Machine, Mario's Early Years! Fun with Letters, Mario's Early Years! Fun with Numbers, Imax's Speed, Undersea Adventure, 3D Dinosaur Adventure, Isaac Asimov's Science Adventure II, Kid's Zoo: A Baby Animal Adventure, 3D Body Adventure, Space Adventure II, Aviation Adventure, America Adventure, Bug Adventure, Imax's The Discoverers, Mario's Early Years! Preschool Fun, Magic Theater, My First Encyclopedia, Zurk's Learning Safari, Zurk's Rainforest Lab, Zurk's Alaskan Trek, Mario's Fundamentals,  Mario's Early Years! Kindergarten Fun, Pyramid: Challenge of the Pharaoh's Dream, Chess Mates, Bricks the Ultimate Construction Toy!, Flipper, Drawing Discoveries, Mario Teachers Typing 2, Kid Keys: The Magical Typing Tutor, Kid Pilots, Dinosaur Adventure 3-D, Lionel Trains Presents: Trans-Con!.

On November 5, 1996, CUC International announced that it would acquire Knowledge Adventure and was completed on February 3, 1997, its Davidson & Associates subsidiary that CUC acquired in February 1996 will later merge with Knowledge Adventure in October 1998.

On May 28, 1997, CUC International announced plans to merge with Hospitality Franchise Systems to create a single, "one-stop" entity. The merger was finalized in December that year and created Cendant. As a result of the merger, CUC Software was renamed Cendant Software. Subsequently, the division was renamed Havas Interactive.

During that time, Knowledge Adventure released many branded games such as JumpStart, Dr. Brain, Fisher-Price, Barbie, Bear in the Big Blue House, Blaster, Teletubbies, Noddy, Jurassic Park III, Captain Kangaroo, Curious George and American Idol.

In October 2004, Vivendi sold Knowledge Adventure to a group of investors interested in taking a more active management strategy, and in developing new educational software. The company has since released new products under both the JumpStart and Math Blaster brands.

In October 2012, Knowledge Adventure changed its name to JumpStart Games.

On March 17, 2014, JumpStart Games purchased Neopets from Viacom.

On July 7, 2017, JumpStart Games was acquired by Chinese online game publisher NetDragon Websoft.

Back-catalog digital re-releases
On November 25, 2014, five Knowledge Adventure titles were re-released digitally as DRM-Free exclusives on ZOOM-Platform.com through a partnership between JumpStart Games and the Jordan Freeman Group. The five titles included 3D Body Adventure, 3D Dinosaur Adventure, Dinosaur Adventure (Original), Space Adventure, and Undersea Adventure.

On March 6, 2015, another Knowledge Adventure title, Bug Adventure, was re-released digitally as a DRM-Free exclusive on ZOOM-Platform.com. This title was also released through the partnership between JumpStart and the Jordan Freeman Group. ZOOM-Platform.com indicated the game was released due to the "incredible reaction" they got to the first batch of Knowledge Adventure titles.

References

Educational software companies
Software companies based in California
Video game companies of the United States
Video game companies established in 1991
Video game development companies
Companies based in Torrance, California
Former Vivendi subsidiaries
2017 mergers and acquisitions